Eva Dögg Sæmundsdóttir (born February 27, 1998) is an Icelandic retired figure skater. She is the 2018 Reykjavik International bronze medalist and a two-time Icelandic national silver medalist.

Personal life 
Eva Dögg was born in Reykjavík February 27, 1998.

Career 
She is a member of Skautafélagið Björninn in Reykjavik where she started skating in 2005.

In 2014/15 she debuted on the international junior scene with a 4th-place finish at the Reykjavik International Games and placed 5th at Avas Cup in Hungary in 2015/16 and 4th at Icelandic Nationals in junior. 2016/17 season Eva Dögg placed 5th at Icelandic Nationals and 4th at Reykjavík International Games which earned her a spot for Iceland at The Nordics where she placed 12th in junior.

Eva debuted as a senior 2017/18 season. She claimed a silver medal at 2017 Icelandic National Championships and after that a bronze at Reykjavik International Games and 14th at the Nordics.

She started the 2018/19 season by being a part of first Team Iceland at Challenger series Autumn Classics in Oakland, Canada and placed 21st. She claimed silver at the 2018 Icelandic National Championships and subsequently 9th at Reykjavik International Games. She then competed at The Nordics and placed 14th and then went to the University Games in Russia where she placed 32nd and did not make the free skate. Eva Dögg is the first Icelandic skater to represent at the University Games.

Eva Dögg was Skater of the year 2018.

Eva Dögg retired from competition in 2019.

Programs

Competitive highlights

References

External links

Icelandic Nationals 2016/17
Icelandic Nationals 2015/16
Icelandic Nationals 2014/15
Eva Dögg Sæmundsdóttir on Rink Results
Eva Dögg Sæmundsdóttir on IceResults

1998 births
Living people
Eva Dogg Saemundsdottir
Eva Dogg Saemundsdottir
Competitors at the 2019 Winter Universiade